Kızıltepe is a town in the Kızıltepe District of Mardin Province in Turkey. The town is mainly populated by Kurds of the Kîkan tribe and had a population of 184,124 in 2021.

Neighborhoods 
Kızıltepe is divided into the eighteen neighborhoods of Atatürk, Bahçelievler, Cumhuriyet, Dunaysır, Ersoylu, Fırat, İpek, Koçhisar, Mevlana, Mezopotamya, Sanayi, Selahattin Eyyubi, Şahkulubey, Tepebaşı, Turgut Özal, Yeni Mahalle, Yenikent and Zergan.

Government 
In the local elections of March 2019 Nilüfer Elik Yılmaz was elected as Mayor. But on 15 November 2019 she was dismissed and a trustee was appointed. The current District Governor is Huseyn Cam, who was also appointed as the state appointed trustee.

History 
The town has a historic 13th century great Friday mosque built by the Artuqids.

On 1 July 1915, during the 1915 genocide in Diyarbekir, there was a massacre in the village where its Christian population was murdered by militia and Kurds. About seventy women were raped in the church, then put to death. Men, women, and children were killed indiscriminately and many victims were decapitated. After the massacre, Kurdish women stabbed any survivors to death. Rafael de Nogales visited weeks later and found "corpses barely covered with heaps of stone from which emerged here and there a bloody tress or an arm or leg gnawed on by hyenas".

In the late 1980s there existed a refugee camp for Kurds who fled persecution by Saddam Hussein.

It was also the scene of clashes between protesting Kurds and Turkish riot police in 2006. In Kiziltepe have been imposed curfews in the past.

Kızıltepe, with +48.8 °C (119.84 °F) on August 14, 1993, holds the record for the highest temperature ever recorded in Turkey.

Notable People 
 Selma Irmak (1971–), Kurdish politician

Notes

Bibliography 

Assyrian communities in Turkey
Populated places in Mardin Province
Towns in Turkey
Kurdish settlements in Mardin Province